2008 in Taiwanese (Chinese Taipei) football.

Overview 
 Chen Sing-an replaced Toshiaki Imai to become Chinese Taipei national football team's main coach.
 Enterprise Football League started on January 5, 2008 and ended on April 27, 2008. Taiwan Power Company F.C. won the league championship and will represent Chinese Taipei in AFC President's Cup 2009.
 National Women's First Division League was held from January 5 to March 2, 2008. Defending champion National Taiwan Normal University women's football team won the league championship.
 Highschool Football League was held from March 29 to April 20, 2008. National Pei Men Senior High School football team won their third championships. 
 AFC Challenge Cup 2008 qualification (Group A) was held in Chungshan Soccer Stadium from April 2 to April 6, 2008. Chinese Taipei did not enter the final round.
 AFC President's Cup 2008 group stage (Group B) was held in Chungshan Soccer Stadium from April 12 to April 16, 2008. Taiwan Power Company F.C. represented Chinese Taipei to participate in the competition but did not enter the final round.
 Intercity Football League will start from August 23, 2008. The qualification tournaments took place from July 19 to August 2. 4 of 5 teams (Hualien, Taipower, Bros, Taipei F.C., and Chia Cheng Hsin) can enter the final tournament. 
 National Youth Cup was held in Taipei County from October 20 to October 26, 2008.

Events 
 March 30, 2008 - Chinese Taipei women's national football team entered the final round of the 2008 AFC Women's Asian Cup.
 May 4, 2008 - National Hsin Feng Senior High School decided to stop enrolling football-specialized students from next semester.
 November 8, 2008 - Chinese Taipei women's national under-19 football team was qualified to enter the AFC U-19 Women's Championship.
 November 14, 2008 - Chinese Taipei women's national under-16 football team qualified for the finals of the AFC U-16 Women's Championship 2009.
 November 21, 2008 - Chinese Taipei Football Association moved its office because of the closure of Chungshan Soccer Stadium.

League competitions

Enterprise Football League

Intercity Football League 

The 2008 season of Intercity Football League will start from August 23, 2008. 

Taipei City (Tatung F.C.), Tainan County, Yilan County, and Taipei County qualified for being the top 4 places in the 2007 season. Taiwan Power Company F.C., Bros, Chia Cheng Hsin, and Hualien County qualified through the qualification tournament held between July 19 and August 2.

National Women's First Division League 

 MVP: Wang Hsiang-huei (NTNU)
 Golden Boot: Lin Yu-hui (Taiwan PE College), Hsieh I-ling (NTNU)
 Best Manager: Chen Wen-fa (NTNU)
 Fair Play: National Taiwan Normal University

Source: Chinese Taipei Football Association

Youth competitions

Highschool Football League 
The 2008 season of Highschool Football League was held from March 29 and April 20, 2008. Chinese Taipei School Sport Federation replaced Chinese Taipei Football Association to become the main sponsor. Totally 17 teams participated in the competition. They were divided into two divisions, north and south, in the preliminary round. The best four teams of each division entered to the final round. Since 2008, the league regulations have forbidden players who have registered or played in the Enterprise Football League or other professional football leagues to participate in HFL.

Under-19 men

Under-16 men

Under-19 women

Under-16 women

National Youth Cup

Futsal

National teams

Chinese Taipei national football team 

 Key
 ACCQ(A) = AFC Challenge Cup qualifying (Group A)
 F = Friendly

Chinese Taipei national under-17 football team 

Key
 LCC = Lion City Cup
 F = Friendly

Chinese Taipei women's national football team 

 Key
 AWCQ(A) = AFC Women's Asian Cup qualifying (Group A)
 AWC = AFC Women's Asian Cup

Chinese Taipei women's national under-19 football team 

 Key
 AUWCQ = AFC U-19 Women's Championship qualification

Chinese Taipei women's national under-16 football team 

 Key
 AUWCQ = AFC U-16 Women's Championship qualification

Chinese Taipei national futsal team 

 Key
 AFCQ(A) = 2008 AFC Futsal Championship qualifying (Group A)
 AFC = 2008 AFC Futsal Championship

References

External links 
 Chinese Taipei School Sport Federation